Nannodiplax rubra, commonly called the pygmy percher, is a species of dragonfly in the monotypic genus Nannodiplax.
Its distribution seems to be limited to Australia and New Guinea. They are tiny dragonflies (wingspan 40 mm, length 25 mm) with a bright red abdomen and clear wings. They are found near a wide variety of rivers and streams. The Australian distribution ranges from Broome, Western Australia via the north and east to around Coffs Harbour, New South Wales. The taxon has not yet been assessed for the IUCN Red List, but it is listed in the Catalogue of Life.

Generic synonymy
There are three synonyms of other species listed in the "World Odonata List":

 Nannodiplax yutsehongi  for Nannophya pygmaea  
 Nannodiplax clara  for Nannophyopsis clara  
 Nannodiplax finschi  for Brachydiplax denticauda

Gallery

See also
 List of Odonata species of Australia

References

External links

 Catalogue of life Nannodiplax rubra

Libellulidae
Odonata of Australia
Insects of Australia
Insects of New Guinea
Taxa named by Friedrich Moritz Brauer
Insects described in 1868